Rizia Bardhan is an American biomolecular engineer who is an Associate Professor of Chemical & Biological Engineering at Iowa State University. She is Associate Editor of ACS Applied Materials & Interfaces.

Early life and education 
Bardhan was an undergraduate student in chemistry at Westminster College and graduated in 2005. She moved to Rice University for her graduate studies, where she worked under the supervision of Naomi Halas. Bardhan completed her doctoral research at Rice, where she studied nanostructures for plasmonic enhancement. When these nanostructures are excited using light they can enhance the fluorescence signatures of nearby molecules. When molecules were 7 nm from the surface of these nanostructures, it was possible to generate an enhancement of 50 times of the fluorescent signal. After earning her doctorate, Bardhan was appointed a research fellow at the Molecular Foundry.

Research and career 
Bardhan joined the faculty at Vanderbilt University in 2012. Her research considered nanomedicine and nanophotonics. In particular, Bardhan studied new imaging modalities for identifying immunomarkers, metabolic imaging using Raman spectroscopy, examinations of the mechano-molecular model of nanomaterials and the mechanisms that underpin photothermal immunotherapies.

In 2020, Bardhan joined the faculty at the Iowa State University as an Associate Professor of Chemical & Biological Engineering. She was awarded over $2 million in funding from the National Institutes of Health for her biomedical engineering program. Bardhan combined her experience creating plasmonic nanostructures with her understanding of immunomarkers to better predict who will respond well to immunotherapy. The approach combined immunoactive gold nanostructures with positron emission tomography and Raman spectroscopy, detecting tumour cells that were expressing a particular biomarker as well as immune cells.

Bardhan was made Associate Editor of ACS Applied Materials & Interfaces in 2021.

Awards and honors 
 2012 Forbes 30 Under 30
 2013 National Science Foundation BRIGE Award
 2014 Oak Ridge Associated Universities  Ralph E. Powe Junior Faculty Enhancement Award
 2020 Westminster College 40 Years, 40 Women Honorees

Selected publications

References

External links

Year of birth missing (living people)
Living people
American bioengineers
American biotechnologists
Westminster College (Missouri) alumni
Rice University alumni
Lawrence Berkeley National Laboratory people
Vanderbilt University faculty
Iowa State University faculty
American women scientists
Academic journal editors
Nanotechnologists
American women academics